The Bukit Merah Lake Railway Bridge or Bukit Merah Marine Viaduct is a double track railway bridge across Bukit Merah Lake in the state of Perak, Malaysia. The 2013 3.5 km double track railway bridge replaced the single track railway causeway crossing the lake.

Bridges in Perak
Rail transport in Perak
Railway bridges in Malaysia